Colonel John Montgomerie (died 1731) was colonial governor of New York and New Jersey from 1728 to 1731.

Life
Montgomerie was born in the parish of Beith in Scotland.  His father, Francis Montgomerie, was a member of the Privy Council under William III and Mary II and Queen Anne, and lord of Castle Giffen in Beith.  When John Montgomerie married, his father gave him the estate at Hessilhead, which was auctioned off in 1722 to pay off accumulated debts.

Montgomerie served in the 3rd Foot Guards, and was elected to Parliament for Ayrshire between 1710 and 1722.  When George II ascended the throne in 1727 he rewarded Montgomerie for his service with the governorship of New York and New Jersey, a position Montgomerie may have sought on account of his financial difficulties.

During Montgomerie's term in New York he presided over the issuance of what became known as the Montgomerie Charter for New York City.  This served as the city's governing charter for more than a century, even though it was never formally approved by the crown.  The city appropriated a sum of £1,000 at the times which may have served as a bribe to various colonial officials, including Montgomerie.  His tenure in office saw the city's export exceed those of Boston and Philadelphia, which had until then been the major trade centers in the North American colonies.  He also oversaw the final agreement of the borders between New York and the neighboring Connecticut Colony.

Montgomerie served as governor until 1 July 1731, when he died of an epileptic seizure. He was replaced on an acting basis by Rip Van Dam in New York and Lewis Morris in New Jersey, who served until his official replacement, William Cosby, arrived to assume the office.

See also
List of colonial governors of New Jersey
List of colonial governors of New York

Notes

References
James Paterson, History of the Counties of Ayr and Wigton, Parts 1-2
New York: A Short History
New York as an Eighteenth Century Municipality
The Scottish Nation, Volume 2

External links
Biography of William Burnet, New Jersey State Library
Usgennet.org The History of New York State, Book II, Chapter III, Part III.  Accessed 18 February 2006.
The Statistical Accounts of Scotland, Account of 1834-45 vol.5 p.583 : Beith, Ayrshire

Year of birth missing
1731 deaths
Scots Guards officers
Governors of the Province of New York
Colonial governors of New Jersey
Members of the Parliament of Great Britain for Scottish constituencies
British MPs 1710–1713
British MPs 1713–1715
British MPs 1715–1722
People from Beith